This is a list of Armenian football transfers in the summer transfer window, by club. Only clubs of the 2020–21 Armenian Premier League Armenian Premier League are included.

Armenian Premier League 2020-21

Alashkert

In:

Out:

Ararat-Armenia

In:

Out:

Ararat Yerevan

In:

Out:

Gandzasar Kapan

In:

Out:

Lori

In:

 

Out:

Noah

In:

Out:

Pyunik

In:

Out:

Shirak

In:

Out:

Urartu

In:

Out:

Van

In:

Out:

References

Armenian
2020
2020–21 in Armenian football